Godoi may refer to:

Surname 

 Juan Silvano Godoi (1850-1926), a librarian and intellectual at the time of the Paraguayan national reconstruction
 Júnior Godoi (born 1978), a Brazilian footballer 
 Rafael Godoi Pereira (born 1985), a Brazilian footballer
 Victor Godoi (born 1975), a retired Argentinian boxer

Placename 
 Cândido Godói, a municipality in Brazil.

See also

 Godoy, a surname